"Surrender" is a song by American rock band Tom Petty & the Heartbreakers. The song has been recorded multiple times over the years but has never been included on a studio album. The song was first released in 2000 as a radio single from the compilation Anthology: Through the Years, and then a live version was available on The Live Anthology. A studio recording from the Damn the Torpedoes sessions was made available on the reissue of the album in 2010. In 2018, a version originally recorded in 1976 was released on the deluxe version of An American Treasure.

Personnel 
An American Treasure & Damn the Torpedoes (Deluxe Edition)

Tom Petty – vocals, rhythm guitar
Ron Blair – bass guitar
Mike Campbell – guitar
Stan Lynch – drums, vocals
Benmont Tench – keyboards, vocals

The Live Anthology

Tom Petty – vocals, rhythm guitar
Mike Campbell – guitar
Howie Epstein – bass guitar, vocals
Stan Lynch – drums, vocals
Benmont Tench – keyboards, vocals

Anthology: Through the Years

Tom Petty – vocals, rhythm guitar
Mike Campbell – guitar
Howie Epstein – bass guitar, vocals
Steve Ferrone – drums
Benmont Tench – keyboards
Scott Thurston – guitar, backing vocals
Lenny Castro - percussion

References 

Tom Petty songs
Songs written by Tom Petty
American power pop songs